Michele Karen Dougherty  (born 1962)  is a Professor of Space Physics at Imperial College London. She is leading unmanned exploratory missions to Saturn and Jupiter and is Principal Investigator for J-MAG – a magnetometer for the European Space Agency's Jupiter Icy Moons Explorer, due for launch in April 2023.

Early life and education
Michele Dougherty became interested in outer space when she was ten years old, when her father built a 10-inch telescope through which she saw the moons of Jupiter and Saturn. Dougherty was educated at the University of Natal where she was awarded a PhD in 1989 for research on wave-particle interactions in dispersive and anisotropic media.

Research
Dougherty left South Africa for a fellowship in Germany, working on applied mathematics, before moving to Imperial College London in 1991. She was appointed a Professor of Space Physics in 2004 and teaches undergraduates alongside her research. She is Head of the Department of Physics at Imperial College London.

Dougherty is the Principal Investigator for two major space missions; the NASA Cassini spacecraft that orbited Saturn and the ESA JUICE spacecraft that will orbit Jupiter's largest moon, Ganymede.

Dougherty's work led to the discovery of an atmosphere containing water and hydrocarbons around Saturn's moon Enceladus — opening up new possibilities in the search for extraterrestrial life.

Dougherty is distinguished by the Royal Society "for her scientific leadership of the international NASA-ESA-ASI Cassini-Huygens mission to Saturn and its moons". As Principal Investigator of the operation, data collection and analysis of observations from the magnetic field instrument on board the Cassini spacecraft, she strongly contributed to improve our understanding of Saturn and the Moons of Saturn. Dougherty cites the flybys of Saturn's moons as a highlight of her career; convincing the NASA spacecraft team to make a closer than usual approach “I watched the data coming back with my heart in my mouth because if we had messed up no one would have ever believed me again!".

Before working on the Cassini-Huygens spacecraft, Dougherty was involved in the magnetometer team for the Jupiter analysis of the Ulysses mission. She was also Guest Investigator on the NASA Jupiter System Data Analysis Program as part of the Galileo unmanned spacecraft.

She regularly delivers public lectures and appears on national media. She was one of the guest scientists interviewed on Jim Al-Khalili's The Life Scientific.

Awards and honours
In 2007, Dougherty won the Chree Medal and Prize from the Institute of Physics for "her contributions to the field of planetary magnetic fields and atmospheres and their interactions with the solar wind".

Dougherty won the 2008 Hughes Medal of the Royal Society "for innovative use of magnetic field data that led to discovery of an atmosphere around one of Saturn's moons and the way it revolutionised our view of the role of planetary moons in the Solar System". She was the second woman ever to receive such an accolade, 102 years after Hertha Ayrton in 1906.

Dougherty was elected a Fellow of the Royal Society in 2012 and was recognized by the UK Science Council as one of the 100 top UK living scientists. She was awarded a prestigious Royal Society Research Professorship in 2014.

Dougherty was awarded the Gold Medal of the Royal Astronomical Society for geophysics in 2017, the fifth woman ever to receive the honour.

Dougherty has contributed significantly to the UK space sector, and chaired the Science Programme Advisory Committee of the UK Space Agency between 2014 and 2016. She was made Commander of the Order of the British Empire (CBE) in the 2018 New Year Honours for "services to UK Physical Science Research". Dougherty won the 2018 Richard Glazebrook Medal and Prize from the Institute of Physics. In 2019 Dougherty was named a Fellow of the American Geophysical Union.

In 2019, Dougherty was named a fellow of the American Geophysical Union.

See also
List of women in leadership positions on astronomical instrumentation projects

References

Academics of Imperial College London
Female Fellows of the Royal Society
Living people
University of Natal alumni
Fellows of the Royal Astronomical Society
British physicists
Fellows of the Royal Society
British women physicists
1962 births
Commanders of the Order of the British Empire
Recipients of the Gold Medal of the Royal Astronomical Society
Fellows of the American Geophysical Union
Planetary scientists
Women planetary scientists